Vilma Lidia Ibarra (born 21 May 1960) is an Argentine lawyer and politician, formerly a Senator and National Deputy representing Buenos Aires. Since 2019, she has been the Legal and Technical Secretary of the Presidency under President Alberto Fernández.

Ibarra was born in Lomas de Zamora, Buenos Aires Province, and moved to the city of Buenos Aires in 1966. She studied at the Colegio Nacional de Buenos Aires, where she led the communist youth wing. She graduated in law at the University of Buenos Aires, and worked as a lawyer. She is the sister of Aníbal Ibarra, the former Chief of the Buenos Aires government.

In 1996, Ibarra became a national deputy and Secretary of the Frepaso block in the Chamber. In 1999, she was elected to the Senate. In 2000, she became a city councillor in Buenos Aires, taking a leading role in her brother's administration. In 2001, she was re-elected to the Senate. Since 2003, she has been a supporter of Peronist President Néstor Kirchner.
In August 2004, Ibarra proposed legislation to legalise abortion. In 2007, she suggested legislative changes to permit same-sex marriage.

In 2007, Ibarra stepped down from the Senate and was re-elected as a national deputy for Buenos Aires, second on the list of Kirchner's Front for Victory.

References

External links

Senate profile
Interview La Nación, 12 February 2006 (Spanish)

1960 births
Living people
People from Lomas de Zamora
Members of the Argentine Senate for Buenos Aires
Members of the Argentine Chamber of Deputies elected in Buenos Aires
Front for a Country in Solidarity politicians
Women members of the Argentine Chamber of Deputies
Argentine people of Basque descent
Argentine people of Paraguayan descent
Women members of the Argentine Senate